Thopha colorata, commonly known as the golden drummer, is an Australian cicada native to Central Australia. Adult cicadas alight exclusively on river red gums (Eucalyptus camaldulensis).

See also
List of cicadas of Australia

References

Thophini
Hemiptera of Australia
Insects described in 1907
Taxa named by William Lucas Distant